Events from the year 1640 in Sweden

Incumbents
 Monarch – Christina

Events

 Foundation of the University of Helsinki in the Swedish province of Finland.
 The first theater in Stockholm, Björngårdsteatern, is opened by Christian Thum.

Births

Deaths

 29 May - Elisabet Juliana Banér, noble (born 1600) 
 November 27 - Gabriel Gustafsson Oxenstierna, politician (born 1587) 
 - Åke Henriksson Tott, soldier and politician (born 1598)

References

External links

 
Years of the 17th century in Sweden
Sweden